Gökyurt is a village in the Yüksekova District of Hakkâri Province in Turkey. The village is populated by Kurds of the Pinyanişi tribe and had a population of 545 in 2022.

The hamlet of Yeşildere is attached to Gökyurt. The hamlet harvests tons of apples annually. It is a former Assyrian settlement.

Population 
Population history from 2000 to 2022:

References 

Villages in Yüksekova District
Kurdish settlements in Hakkâri Province
Historic Assyrian communities in Turkey